Philomedidae is a family of ostracods belonging to the order Myodocopida.

Genera

Genera:
 Anarthron Kornicker, 1975
 Angulorostrum Kornicker, 1981
 Euphilomedes Kornicker, 1967

References

Ostracods